IRIB Quran (شبكه’  قرآن, Shibkâh-e' Qârân in Persian), is an Islamic Republic of Iran Broadcasting television channel, broadcast in Worldwide.

The channel is one of the television channels in Iran and was established on 11 December 2000. The channel is about life, religion and Quran.

History 
On December 27, 2020, IRIB Quran announced that they will organise a Quran reciting session in the shrine of Hazrat Zeinab in Damascus on January 2, 2021.

On January 27, 2022, the channel was hacked, along with several other IRIB channels, for "10 seconds".

References

External links

IRIB Quran Live streaming

Television stations in Iran
Persian-language television stations
Islamic Republic of Iran Broadcasting
Television channels and stations established in 2000
Mass media in Tehran